Los protegidos: El regreso is a Spanish fantasy television series that began airing on Atresplayer Premium in September 2021. It consists of a continuation of Los protegidos, set about a decade later than the events dealt with in the original series.

Premise 
Set a decade after the events that brought  Los protegidos to a happy closure, the 'Castillo Rey' family—a group of initially unrelated people empowered with supernatural abilities—teams up again to deal with a new threat.

Cast

Production and release 
The series consists of a continuation of the series Los protegidos, which aired on Antena 3 from 2010 to 2012. None of the two creators of the original series (Darío Madrona and Ruth García) were involved in the revival.

Consisting of 4 episodes, the series was directed by José María Caro and written by Carlos García Miranda and Curro Serrano. Shooting began in April 2021.

Atresmedia scheduled the release of the first episode for 19 September 2021.

In December 2021, Atresmedia reported the renovation of the series for a second season.

References 

Spanish-language television shows
Spanish fantasy television series
2020s Spanish drama television series
2021 Spanish television series debuts
Atresplayer Premium original programming
Spanish thriller television series
Television series by Boomerang TV
Television series by Buendía Estudios